Phyprosopus tristriga is a moth of the family Noctuidae first described by Gottlieb August Wilhelm Herrich-Schäffer in 1868. It is endemic to the Antilles, including Dominica, Cuba and Puerto Rico.

References

Moths described in 1868
Calpinae